The men's pétanque triples event in boules sports at the 2001 World Games took place from 17 to 19 August 2001 at the World Games Plaza in Akita, Japan.

Competition format
A total of 6 teams entered the competition. In preliminary round they played round-robin tournament. From this stage the best four pairs advanced to the semifinals.

Results

Preliminary

Finals

References

External links
 Results on IWGA website

Boules sports at the 2001 World Games